Daniel 'Dani' Quintana Sosa (born 8 March 1987) is a Spanish professional footballer who plays as a winger.

Club career
Born in Las Palmas, Canary Islands, Quintana only played lower league football in his country, representing Ontinyent CF, UD Alzira, Racing de Ferrol, CD Olímpic de Xàtiva and Gimnàstic de Tarragona in the Segunda División B. He appeared for UD Puçol, Valencia CF Mestalla and Huracán Valencia CF in Tercera División.

In the late hours of the January 2013 transfer window, Quintana signed with Poland's Jagiellonia Białystok after a successful trial and after terminating his contract with Nàstic, in what was his first professional experience. He made his debut in the Ekstraklasa on 23 February against Podbeskidzie Bielsko-Biała, and scored his first goal on 3 March in a 2–1 away win over Górnik Zabrze.

On 29 September 2014, Quintana joined Al Ahli Saudi FC. He netted his first and only goal for the Saudi club on 18 October, helping to a 2–1 home defeat of Al Nassr FC.

Quintana changed teams and countries again in March 2015, moving to the Azerbaijan Premier League after signing a three-year contract with Qarabağ FK. On 17 June 2018, the 31-year-old renewed his link until 2020.

On 3 February 2020, Quintana signed with China League One side Chengdu Better City FC.

Club statistics

Honours

Club
Qarabağ
Azerbaijan Premier League: 2015–16, 2016–17, 2017–18, 2018–19
Azerbaijan Cup: 2015–16, 2016–17

Individual
Azerbaijan Premier League top scorer: 2015–16

References

External links

CiberChe stats and bio 

1987 births
Living people
Footballers from Las Palmas
Spanish footballers
Association football wingers
Segunda División B players
Tercera División players
Valencia CF Mestalla footballers
Ontinyent CF players
UD Alzira footballers
Racing de Ferrol footballers
Huracán Valencia CF players
CD Olímpic de Xàtiva footballers
Gimnàstic de Tarragona footballers
Ekstraklasa players
Jagiellonia Białystok players
Saudi Professional League players
Al-Ahli Saudi FC players
Azerbaijan Premier League players
Qarabağ FK players
China League One players
Chengdu Better City F.C. players
Spanish expatriate footballers
Expatriate footballers in Poland
Expatriate footballers in Saudi Arabia
Expatriate footballers in Azerbaijan
Expatriate footballers in China
Spanish expatriate sportspeople in Poland
Spanish expatriate sportspeople in Saudi Arabia
Spanish expatriate sportspeople in Azerbaijan
Spanish expatriate sportspeople in China